Bob Bryan and Mike Bryan were the defending champions, but lost in the quarterfinals to Jonas Björkman and Kevin Ullyett.

Mariusz Fyrstenberg and Marcin Matkowski won in the final 6–4, 6–2, against Mahesh Bhupathi and Mark Knowles.

Seeds
All seeds receive a bye into the second round.

Draw

Finals

Top half

Bottom half

External links
-Main Draw

Doubles